A hydrant is an outlet from a fluid main often consisting of an upright pipe with a valve attached, from which fluid (e.g. water or fuel) can be tapped.

Depending on the fluid involved, the term may refer to:

 Fire hydrant for firefighting water supply
 Flushing hydrant for cleaning water mains
 Hydrant network systems used to transport aviation fuel from an oil depot to an airport, to fuel aircraft
 Snowmaking hydrants, which use water and air
 Standpipe (street), a type of domestic or neighbourhood hydrant for dispensing water when supply is interrupted or absent

Fluid dynamics